Joseph "Joe" Krische is a former U.S. soccer defender.  Various sources, including the National Soccer Hall of Fame, misspell Krische's name as  Kriesch and Kriesche.  He earned three caps with the U.S. national team in 1960 and 1961.

Club career
Krische played for Blau-Weiss Gottschee of the New York German American Soccer League (GASL) for nineteen seasons with twelve of those seasons coming in the GASL First Division.  In 1960, he also played for New York in the International Soccer League.

National team
Krische played two World Cup qualification games in November 1960.  On November 6, 1960, the U.S. played to a 3-3 tie with Mexico followed by a 3-0 loss to Mexico seven days later.  His third, and final, game with the national team came in a 2-0 loss to Colombia on February 5, 1961.

He served for several years as the president of the Blau-Weiss Gottschee Soccer Club.

External links
 National Soccer Hall of Fame eligibility bio

Living people
United States men's international soccer players
German-American Soccer League players
Blau-Weiss Gottschee players
International Soccer League players
American soccer players
Association football defenders
Year of birth missing (living people)